The Valley Huskers (formerly known as the Chilliwack Huskers) are a Canadian Junior Football team based in Chilliwack, British Columbia. The Huskers play in the eight-team B.C. Football Conference, which itself is part of the Canadian Junior Football League (CJFL) and competes annually for the national title known as the Canadian Bowl. The Huskers were founded in 1999 by Keith Currie, also known as "Father Football". Keith was also a co-founder of Chilliwack Minor Football.

External links
Valley Huskers website
Canadian Junior Football League

Canadian football teams in British Columbia
Canadian Junior Football League teams
Sport in Chilliwack
1999 establishments in British Columbia
Sports clubs established in 1999